Pillow Rock is an insular rock forming the easternmost element of Hauge Reef, lying 3.3 nautical miles (6 km) west of Cape Darnley, South Georgia. So named following British Antarctic Survey (BAS) geological work, 1975–76, from the pillow lavas that compose the feature.

Rock formations of Antarctica